John Forrest Sharpe is an American publisher and author. He has published of numerous articles and books on the economic theory of distributism. He is chairman of the publishing house IHS Press in Virginia; the vice-chairman is Derek Holland. IHS Press and the Legion of St. Louis (LSL), another publishing entity run by Sharpe that sells books such as Henry Ford's The International Jew and Michael A. Hoffman II's Strange Gods of Judaism, are on the list of hate groups for the nonprofit left-wing organization Southern Poverty Law Center.

Controversies over alleged racist views 
He is a graduate of the U.S. Naval Academy and a former submarine officer and media spokesman for the Atlantic Fleet.

On March 7, 2007, John Sharpe was temporarily relieved of duty pending a Navy inquiry into allegations that he was involved in supremacist activities. 

In 2008, the Catholic University of America canceled a lecture series in which Sharpe was to speak after the Southern Poverty Law Center said Sharpe is anti-Semitic, though no review of his written opinion had occurred.

Sharpe later filed suit against Landmark Communications, claiming defamation in a news story. The suit sought $5 million in compensatory damages and $350,000 in punitive damages. In April 2009, Norfolk Circuit Court judge Norman A. Thomas issued his opinion. In it, Thomas grants a summary judgment to the defendants on the major issues of the case, concluding that Sharpe's writings "do espouse anti-Semitic and racist views...No reasonable person can read Sharpe's individual writings and conclude that he espouses anything other than a deep, abiding and pervasive suspicion of and hostility toward Jews, whether considered as a collective people, religion, nation or ethnic group."

Speaking engagements 

In 2005, Sharpe visited Australia to speak on Catholic social teachings. In conjunction with the Australian Thomas More Centre, he gave a talk entitled The Third Way: Distributism and the New Politics to a breakfast scheduled between the Annual National Civic Council Conference and the Thomas More Summer School. The event was recorded in the journal AD2000.

References

External links 
 IHS Press
 Distributism Defended

American publishers (people)
Living people
Year of birth missing (living people)
Place of birth missing (living people)
United States Naval Academy alumni
United States Navy officers
Distributism